The Sula is a left tributary of the Dnieper with a total length of 363 km and a drainage basin of 19,600 km².

The river flows into the Dnieper through the Kremenchuk Reservoir, with which it forms a large delta with numerous islands, on which rare kinds of birds live. An important tributary is the Uday, smaller ones being Orzhytsya, Sliporid, Romen and Tern.

Large cities located on the river are Romny, Lokhvytsia and Lubny.

The river's name evokes slow or muddy waters considering the words it is related to: Lithuanian/Latvian sulà "birch sap", Old Prussian sulo "curdled milk", Norwegian dialectal saula "dirt", Sanskrit súrā "spiritous liquor", and Avestan hurā "intoxicating drink, kumis". Another etymology of the hydronym Sula is the Turkic , 'filled with water, wet'.

References

Rivers of Chernihiv Oblast
Rivers of Sumy Oblast